Lorenz Hopfenmüller, also known as Father Otto Hopfenmüller, was a Catholic priest of the religious order of the Society of the Divine Saviour. He was the first Apostolic prefect of the Roman Catholic Archdiocese of Shillong (Assam Mission).

Early life 
Hopfenmüller was born on 29 May 1844 in Weismain, Germany. He completed his doctorate from University of Würzburg.

Priesthood 
On 6 October 1866, Hopfenmüller was ordained a priest for the Roman Catholic Archdiocese of Bamberg but in 1887 he became a professed member of the Society of the Divine Saviour and took the religious name Otto.

Foreign mission 
In 1889, Hopfenmüller was sent to a foreign mission in Assam, India and was appointed prefect of the mission on 31 December 1889. He started to translate the Holy Bible and wrote catechism in local Khasi language.

Death 
Hopfenmüller died in Assam, India on 20 August 1890 due to heat stroke.

See  also 
List of saints of India

References 

Salvatorians
Christian missionaries in India
19th-century German Roman Catholic priests
1844 births
1890 deaths
German missionaries